BlueFocus Communication Group() is an ad agency engaged in marketing.

BlueFocus was founded by Oscar Zhao on July 1, 1996. It was launched on the Shenzhen Stock Exchange in 2010.

BlueFocus acquired a minority stake in Huntsworth, a London-based PR group, for £36.5 million in April 2013, and in December 2013, acquired a majority holding in social media marketing organisation We Are Social for £18.7m.

Since 2014, BlueFocus has engaged in international expansion. It acquired a majority holding in Fuseproject, a U.S. design agency, for $46.7 million in July 2014, and a majority holding in the North American assets of Canadian advertising company Vision7 International, including Cossette, an ad agency, and Citizen Relation, a PR company, in December 2014 for $210 million.

By 2014, it was listed on the Shenzhen Stock Exchange with a market capitalisation of $3.8 billion, and was ranked as the 17th largest ad agency in the world. As of 2015, its clients included PepsiCo, Lenovo, Volkswagen, and BMW.

In 2017, it attempted to merge its international efforts with US-based Fluent, but eventually discontinued the effort over political concerns. In 2019, it advanced into an arrangement whereby its international subsidiaries were partially divested into a separate company Blue Impact, which was to be purchased by a special purpose acquisition company (SPAC) Legacy Acquisition led by ex-Procter & Gamble executives Edwin Rigaud and Darryl McCall to publicly list in the United States.

References 

Advertising agencies of China